In graph theory, the Erdős–Faber–Lovász conjecture is a problem about graph coloring, named after Paul Erdős, Vance Faber, and László Lovász, who formulated it in 1972.  It says:

If  complete graphs, each having exactly  vertices, have the property that every pair of complete graphs has at most one shared vertex, then the union of the graphs can be properly colored with  colors.

Equivalent formulations
 introduced the problem with a story about seating assignment in committees: suppose that, in a university department, there are  committees, each consisting of  faculty members, and that all committees meet in the same room, which has  chairs. Suppose also that at most one person belongs to the intersection of any two committees. Is it possible to assign the committee members to chairs in such a way that each member sits in the same chair for all the different committees to which he or she belongs? In this model of the problem, the faculty members correspond to graph vertices, committees correspond to complete graphs, and chairs correspond to vertex colors.

A linear hypergraph (also known as partial linear space) is a hypergraph with the property that every two hyperedges have at most one vertex in common. A hypergraph is said to be uniform if all of its hyperedges have the same number of vertices as each other. The  cliques of size  in the Erdős–Faber–Lovász conjecture may be interpreted as the hyperedges of an -uniform linear hypergraph that has the same vertices as the underlying graph. In this language, the Erdős–Faber–Lovász conjecture states that, given any -uniform linear hypergraph with  hyperedges, one may -color the vertices such that each hyperedge has one vertex of each color.

A simple hypergraph is a hypergraph in which at most one hyperedge connects any pair of vertices and there are no hyperedges of size at most one. In the graph coloring formulation of the Erdős–Faber–Lovász conjecture, it is safe to remove vertices that belong to a single clique, as their coloring presents no difficulty; once this is done, the hypergraph that has a vertex for each clique, and a hyperedge for each graph vertex, forms a simple hypergraph.
And, the hypergraph dual of vertex coloring is edge coloring. Thus, the Erdős–Faber–Lovász conjecture is equivalent to the statement that any simple hypergraph with  vertices has chromatic index (edge coloring number) at most .

The graph of the Erdős–Faber–Lovász conjecture may be represented as an intersection graph of sets: to each vertex of the graph, correspond the set of the cliques containing that vertex, and connect any two vertices by an edge whenever their corresponding sets have a nonempty intersection. Using this description of the graph, the conjecture may be restated as follows: if some family of sets has  total elements, and any two sets intersect in at most one element, then the intersection graph of the sets may be -colored.

As they observe, the Erdős–Faber–Lovász conjecture is equivalent to the statement that the chromatic number of any graph is at most equal to its linear intersection number.

 present another yet equivalent formulation, in terms of the theory of clones.

History, partial results, and eventual proof
Paul Erdős, Vance Faber, and László Lovász formulated the harmless looking conjecture at a party in Boulder Colorado in September 1972. Its difficulty was
realised only slowly.
Paul Erdős originally offered US$50 for proving the conjecture in the affirmative, and later raised the reward to US$500. In fact, Paul Erdős considered this to be one of his three most favourite combinatorial problems.

In 2021, almost 50 years after the original conjecture was stated, it was resolved for all sufficiently large .

Related problems
It is also of interest to consider the chromatic number of graphs formed as the union of  cliques of  vertices each, without restricting how big the intersections of pairs of cliques can be. In this case, the chromatic number of their union is at most , and some graphs formed in this way require this many colors.

A version of the conjecture that uses the fractional chromatic number in place of the chromatic number is known to be true. That is, if a graph  is formed as the union of  -cliques that intersect pairwise in at most one vertex, then  can be -colored.

In the framework of edge coloring simple hypergraphs,  defines a number  from a simple hypergraph as the number of hypergraph vertices that belong to a hyperedge of three or more vertices. In the formulation of coloring graphs formed by unions of cliques, Hindman's result shows that the conjecture is true whenever at most ten of the cliques contain a vertex that belongs to three or more cliques.

See also
 List of conjectures by Paul Erdős

Notes

References 

.
.
.
. Solutions by Ilias Kastanas, Charles Vanden Eynden, and Richard Holzsager, American Mathematical Monthly 100 (7): 692–693, 1992.
.
.
. Corrected in JCTB 51 (2): 329, 1991, to add Tuza's name as coauthor.

.
.

.
.

Graph coloring
Conjectures
Unsolved problems in graph theory
Faber–Lovász conjecture